Teleprompter Corp. v. Columbia Broadcasting, 415 U.S. 394 (1974), was a United States Supreme Court case in which the Court held that receiving a television broadcast from a "distant" source does not constitute a "performance".

See also 
 Loretto v. Teleprompter Manhattan CATV Corp.

References

External links
 

1974 in United States case law
United States copyright case law
United States Supreme Court cases
United States Supreme Court cases of the Burger Court
TelePrompTer Corporation
CBS Television Network